The Mecca Covered Bridge crossing Big Raccoon Creek East of Mecca, Indiana is a single span Burr Arch Truss covered bridge structure that was built by J. J. Daniels in 1873.

It was added to the National Register of Historic Places in 1978.

Gallery

See also
 List of Registered Historic Places in Indiana
 Parke County Covered Bridges
 Parke County Covered Bridge Festival

References

Covered bridges on the National Register of Historic Places in Parke County, Indiana
Bridges completed in 1873
Bridges Built by J. J. Daniels
Wooden bridges in Indiana
Burr Truss bridges in the United States
1873 establishments in Indiana